Nicola Demaine is an English football manager who manages Papua New Guinea.

Career

In 2018, Demaine was appointed manager of Samoa. In 2021, she was appointed manager of Papua New Guinea, helping them win the 2022 OFC Women's Nations Cup, their only major trophy.

References

English expatriate sportspeople in Samoa
English women's football managers
Expatriate football managers in Papua New Guinea
Expatriate football managers in Samoa
Living people
Samoa women's national football team managers
Year of birth missing (living people)